The Barbado da Terceira is Portuguese breed of herding and guard dog from the Atlantic island of Terceira in the Azores, for which it is named. It was recognised by the Direcção-Geral de Veterinária of Portugal in 2004. It is not recognised by the Fédération Cynologique Internationale.

History 

The Barbado da Terceira derives from the various dogs brought to the Azores by colonists and visitors since settlement of the islands began in the fifteenth century, particularly from those with an aptitude for cattle herding. It was used both as a herding dog and as a guard dog.

It was recognised by the Direcção-Geral de Veterinária of Portugal in 2004, based on the results of a collaboration between the Clube Português de Canicultura, the Direcção Regional de Agricultura of Terceira and the University of the Azores. A census in 2005 found 222 of the dogs.

It is not recognised by the Fédération Cynologique Internationale.

Description

References 

Catch dogs
Dog breeds originating in Portugal
Rare dog breeds